Psychology and Alchemy, volume 12 in The Collected Works of C. G. Jung, is Carl Jung's study of the analogies between alchemy, Christian dogma, and psychological symbolism.

Alchemy is central to Jung's hypothesis of the collective unconscious. This book begins with an outline of the process and aims of psychotherapy as seen by Jung. It then moves on to work out the analogies mentioned above and his own understanding of the analytic process. Jung reminds us of the dual nature of alchemy, comprising both the chemical process and a parallel mystical component. He also discusses the seemingly deliberate mystification of the alchemists. Finally, in using the alchemical process to provide insights into individuation, Jung emphasises the importance of alchemy in relating to us the transcendent nature of the psyche.

Detailed abstracts of each chapter are available online. (Cover art by Mohammed Derbala)

Overview

In this book, Jung argues for a reevaluation of the symbolism of Alchemy as being intimately related to the psychoanalytical process. Using a cycle of dreams of one of his patients he shows how the symbols used by the Alchemists occur in the psyche as part of the reservoir of mythological images drawn upon by the individual in their dream states. Jung draws an analogy between the Great Work of the Alchemists and the process of reintegration and individuation of the psyche in the modern psychiatric patient.

In drawing these parallels Jung reinforces the universal nature of his theory of the archetype and makes an impassioned argument for the importance of spirituality in the psychic health of the modern man. Lavishly illustrated with images, drawings and paintings from Alchemy and other mythological sources including Christianity the book is another example of Jung's immense erudition and fascination with the eso- and exoteric expressions of spirituality and the psyche in religion and mysticism.

Influenced by pioneering work by Ethan Allen Hitchcock and Herbert Silberer (who was in turn influenced by Jung), Psychology and Alchemy is a seminal work of reevaluation of a forgotten system of thought which did much to revitalise interest in Alchemy as a serious force in Western philosophical and esoteric culture.

Also interesting about this book is that the patient whose dreams are being analyzed in the second section is the physicist Wolfgang Pauli, who would go on to collaborate with Jung on such ideas as the acausal connecting principle of synchronicity. The dreams are interpreted as a series to elucidate the meanings of recurring motifs and symbols, with the series culminating in the vision of a 'world clock', which is actually several clocks on different planes operating on different scales and colours as a symbol of Pauli's unconscious apprehension of some grand cosmic order. Three of the best of these dreams were also mentioned by Jung in his Terry lectures Psychology of Religion.

Content

The fundamental thesis Jung is advancing about the relationship between Alchemy and Psychology is that for pre-scientific humans there is not a sharp distinction between subject and object and thus this leads them to unconsciously project their own inner states onto external objects (especially objects that are mostly unknown to them), so a reflective analysis of alchemical symbols becomes revelatory about the unconscious psychic life of this time period. Prior to this rational segregation of experience the world was a totally different one, phenomenologically, as people did not distinguish between the qualities of the object they were perceiving and their own values, emotions, and beliefs. It is partly for this reason that the alchemists cannot say aloud exactly what the philosopher's stone really 'is' and why there are so many different symbols for the work.

For the alchemist trying to understand matter and develop base metals into their purest form, gold, substances are grouped as being alike based on their perceived value. Jung documents as these alchemists collectively come to understand that they themselves must embody the change they hope to effect within their materials: for instance, if they hope to achieve the philosopher's stone that can redeem 'base' or 'vulgar' metals, then the alchemist too must become a redeemer figure. It became apparent to the alchemists that they were trying to redeem nature as Christ had redeemed man, hence the identification of the Lapis Philosophorum with Christ the Redeemer. The Opus (work) of alchemy, viewed through this interpretation, becomes a symbolic account of the fundamental process the human psyche undergoes as it re-orients its value system and creates meaning out of chaos. The opus beginning with the nigredo (blackening, akin to depression or nihilistic loss of value) in order to descend back into the manipulable prima materia and proceeding through a process of spiritual purification that must unite seemingly irreconcilable opposites (the coniunctio) to achieve new levels of consciousness.

Part I. Introduction to the Religious and Psychological Problems of Alchemy

Jung sets out the central thesis of the book: that Alchemy draws upon a vast array of symbols, images and patterns drawn from the Collective Unconscious. Jung defends his exploration of the Psyche and Soul against various critics who have accused him of being both religious and anti-religious depending on their point of view. He argues for a deeper understanding of the Western spiritual traditions e.g. Esoteric Christianity and Alchemy alongside an examination of the Eastern ones e.g. Buddhism, Hinduism etc. Jung diagnoses the spiritual laziness of the West in not truly embracing the Christian Myth as an inner journey of transformation. Alchemy, he argues, is a 'Western Yoga' which was designed to facilitate this. The book will begin with a description of a whole cycle of dreams described by an unnamed patient (to protect confidentiality) which will be interpreted in their archetypal and mythological sense by Jung. This is designed to illustrate the existence of Jung's theory of the Collective Unconscious and the psychological goal or Great Work of psychic and spiritual integration or wholeness through the individuation process
that affects the mind state.

Part II. Individual Dream Symbolism in Alchemy

Jung sets out his agenda and explains his method. The text that follows will contain several cycles of dreams recounted by a patient to a student of Jung. Each dream will be described and then analysed and interpreted with reference to Alchemical imagery and psychoanalytic theory. Jung is at pains to explain that the patient knew nothing of Jung's interpretations and so was not influenced in any way during the dream process.

Jung details an entire cycle of the patient's dreams, summarising the details of each then interpreting them in terms of their parallels with alchemical imagery to reveal their psychological content.

Part III. Religious Ideas in Alchemy

 Chapter 1 - Basic Concepts of Alchemy
 Chapter 2 - The Psychic Nature of Alchemical Work
 Chapter 3 - The Work
 Chapter 4 - The Prima Materia
 Chapter 5 - The Lapis-Christ Parallel
 Chapter 6 - Alchemical Symbolism in the History of Religion

Quotations

Editions
 Jung, C. G. 1968. Psychology and Alchemy, Collected Works of C. G. Jung. Princeton, NJ: Princeton University Press. 
 Jung, C. G. 1980. Psychology and Alchemy (2nd ed.), Collected Works of C. G. Jung. London: Routledge. 
 Jung, C. G. 1980, Psychology and Alchemy Arabic version 2023 Translated by Salma Elsharkawy From ElRawy publishing house (Cover art by Mohammed Derbala)

References

Alchemy
Works by Carl Jung
Princeton University Press books
Routledge books